This is a list of singles that charted in the top ten of the ARIA Charts in 2017. In 2017, twenty-seven acts reached the top ten for the first time.

Top-ten singles

Key

2002 peaks

2013 peaks

2016 peaks

2018 peaks 

Notes:
The single re-entered the top 10 on 2 January 2017.
The single re-entered the top 10 on 23 January 2017.
The single re-entered the top 10 on 20 March 2017.
The single re-entered the top 10 on 17 July 2017.
The single re-entered the top 10 on 24 July 2017.
The single re-entered the top 10 on 31 July 2017.
The single re-entered the top 10 on 2 October 2017.
The single re-entered the top 10 on 9 October 2017.
The single re-entered the top 10 on 16 October 2017.
The single re-entered the top 10 on 23 October 2017.
The single re-entered the top 10 on 6 November 2017.
The single re-entered the top 10 on 27 November 2017.
The single re-entered the top 10 on 18 December 2017.

Entries by artist
The following table shows artists who achieved two or more top 10 entries in 2017, including songs that reached their peak in 2016 and 2018. The figures include both main artists and featured artists. The total number of weeks an artist spent in the top ten in 2017 is also shown.

See also
2017 in music
ARIA Charts
List of number-one singles of 2017 (Australia)
List of top 10 albums in 2017 (Australia)

References

Australia Singles Top 10
Top 10 singles
Top 10 singles 2017
Australia 2017